The All-Ireland Senior Hurling Championship of 1967 was the 81st staging of Ireland's premier hurling knock-out competition.  Kilkenny won the championship, beating Tipperary 3-8 to 2-7 in the final at Croke Park, Dublin.

Format

The All-Ireland Senior Hurling Championship was run on a provincial basis as usual.  All games were played on a knockout basis whereby once a team lost they were eliminated from the championship.  The format for the All-Ireland series of games ran as follows: 
 There were no All-Ireland semi-finals.
 The winners of the Munster Championship advanced directly to the All-Ireland final.  
 The winners of the Leinster Championship advanced directly to the All-Ireland final.  
 The Ulster Championship remained suspended due to a lack of competition.  
 Galway, a team who faced no competition in the Connacht Championship, played in the Munster Championship for the ninth consecutive year.

Fixtures

Leinster Senior Hurling Championship

Munster Senior Hurling Championship

All-Ireland Senior Hurling Championship

Top scorers

Season

Single game

References

 Corry, Eoghan, The GAA Book of Lists (Hodder Headline Ireland, 2005).
 Donegan, Des, The Complete Handbook of Gaelic Games (DBA Publications Limited, 2005).

See also

1967
All-Ireland Senior Hurling Championship